Aleksandr Kovalyov may refer to:
 Aleksandr Gennadyevich Kovalyov (1973–1999), Russian Army officer and Hero of the Russian Federation
 Aleksandr Kovalyov (footballer, born 1980) (1980–2005), Russian footballer
 Aleksandr Petrovich Kovalyov (born 1950), Russian football manager
 Aleksandr Sergeyevich Kovalyov (born 1982), Russian footballer
 Aleksandr Vladimirovich Kovalyov (born 1975), Russian sprint canoer
 Aleksandr Alexandrovich Kovalyov (born 1986), Uzbekistani footballer